Lierni Lekuona Etxebeste (born 8 April 1995) is a Spanish racing cyclist, who currently rides for Spanish amateur team Lezokuak.

See also
 List of 2015 UCI Women's Teams and riders

References

External links

1995 births
Living people
Spanish female cyclists
People from Errenteria
Sportspeople from Gipuzkoa
Cyclists from the Basque Country (autonomous community)